To the Orient (Swedish: Till österland) is a 1926 Swedish silent drama film directed by Gustaf Molander and starring Lars Hanson, Jenny Hasselqvist and Mona Mårtenson. It was shot at the Råsunda Studios in Stockholm and on location in Jaffa and Jerusalem in Mandatory Palestine. The film's sets were designed by the art director Vilhelm Bryde. Based on the novel Jerusalem by Selma Lagerlöf, it is the sequel to the 1925 film Ingmar's Inheritance.

Cast
 Lars Hanson as Ingmar
 Jenny Hasselqvist as 	Barbro
 Mona Mårtenson as Gertrud
 Harald Schwenzen as 	Gabriel Mattson
 Ivan Hedqvist as 	Stark-Anders
 Gabriel Alw as 	Nameless Messiah
 Edvin Adolphson as 	Stig Börjesson
 Nils Aréhn as Teacher
 Ida Brander as Skolmästarns hustru
 Knut Lindroth as Sven Persson

References

Bibliography
 Larsson, Mariah & Marklund, Anders. Swedish Film: An Introduction and Reader. Nordic Academic Press, 2010.
 Qvist, Per Olov & von Bagh, Peter. Guide to the Cinema of Sweden and Finland. Greenwood Publishing Group, 2000.

External links

1926 films
1926 drama films
Swedish drama films
Swedish silent feature films
Swedish black-and-white films
1920s Swedish-language films
Films directed by Gustaf Molander
Swedish sequel films
Films based on Swedish novels
Silent drama films
1920s Swedish films